Camellia pubicosta is a species of flowering plant in the Theaceae family. It is mainly cultivated in Vietnam. It is shrubby plant. Its height is 8–10 meters.

See also
 Camellia sinensis

References

pubicosta
Flora of Vietnam